KEXA (93.9 FM) is an American radio station licensed by the Federal Communications Commission (FCC) to serve the community of King City, California, which is in Southern Monterey County. KEXA-FM is licensed to and operated by Daniel Alcantar, through licensee Inspiration Media Network, LLC.

KEXA previously had a bilingual Top 40 format named Exa FM until May 2, 2008  that was targeted at the Salinas Valley's Hispanic population. It had licensed the format from MVS Radio of Mexico.

External links

EXA
Regional Mexican radio stations in the United States
EXA
Radio stations established in 1982
1982 establishments in California